Plica umbra, the blue-lipped tree lizard or harlequin racerunner, is a species of lizard in the family Tropiduridae. The species is found in South America (Colombia, Venezuela, Guyana, Suriname, French Guiana, Brazil, Bolivia, Peru, and Ecuador).

References

Plica
Lizards of South America
Reptiles of Venezuela
Reptiles described in 1758